Albert Narath (13 September 1864, Vienna – 15 August 1924, Heidelberg) was an Austrian surgeon and anatomist.

He was an assistant of Theodor Billroth (1829-1894) at the University of Vienna, and from 1896 to 1906 was a professor of surgery at Utrecht. In 1906 he succeeded Vincenz Czerny (1842-1916) as chair of surgery at the University of Heidelberg surgical clinic. He resigned this position in 1910 due to health reasons, but continued to contribute articles to scientific publications during the ensuing years.

Narath made contributions in his studies involving the structure of bronchial systems, as well as in investigations of hernias. His name is lent to "Narath’s femoral hernia" (prevascular hernia), being described as a hernia behind the femoral vessels that is due to displacement of the psoas muscle in patients with congenital hip dislocation.

Narath was the author of papers on varicocele surgery, pneumatocele parotid, retroperitoneal lymph cysts and omentum-plasty, to name a few.

References 
 University Clinic of Heidelberg (biography)

External links 
 Surgery in Austria

Academic staff of Heidelberg University
Austrian surgeons
1864 births
1924 deaths
Physicians from Vienna